Candidatus "Methylomirabilis oxyfera" is a candidate species of Gram-negative bacteria belonging to the NC10 phylum, characterized for its capacity to couple anaerobic methane oxidation with nitrite reduction in anoxic environments. To acquire oxygen for methane oxidation, M. oxyfera utilizes an intra-aerobic pathway through the reduction of nitrite (NO2) to dinitrogen (N2) and oxygen.

Enrichment 
Enriched Ca. "M. oxyfera" cells have been identified as primarily having a unique polygonal cell shape through the use of electron microscopy techniques. Unlike methanotrophic Pseudomonadota, Ca. "M. oxyfera" cells lack intracytoplasmic membranes when grown under laboratory conditions. The optimum growth ranges for Ca. "M. oxyfera" is between pH 7-8 and 25-30 °C. Ca. "M. oxyfera"cell envelopes are Gram-negative and are generally 0.25–0.5 μm in diameter and 0.8–1.1 μm in length.

Methane oxidation 
Ca. "M. oxyfera" has the capacity to disproportionate nitric oxide into oxygen and nitrogen gas. This intermediate oxygen is then used in the oxidation of methane into carbon dioxide.

Overall reactions 
Nitrogen oxide dismutation:

Methane oxidation:

Environmental significance 

Ca. "M. oxyfera" has been identified in several environments including rice paddy soil in China, multiple river and lake sediments, and wastewater sludge in The Netherlands. Ca. "M. oxyfera" is predicted to inhabit environments with high concentrations of nitrogen and methane, near boundaries that separate oxic and anoxic zones. It is suggested that Ca. "M. oxyfera" and similar organisms contribute to the global carbon and nitrogen cycles. These organisms may also play a role in reducing the nutrient loads within freshwater ecosystems that have been contaminated with fertilizers.

See also 
 List of bacterial orders
 List of bacteria genera

References 

Gram-negative bacteria
Candidatus taxa